Ann Alexander (or similar) may refer to:

Ann Alexander (banker) (1770–1861), British Quaker, banker and bill broker
Ann Dunlop Alexander (born 1896), Scottish artist
Ann Alexander (ship), whaler
Anne Jardin (born 1959), married name Anne Alexander, swimmer
Anne Alexander, editor of Prevention magazine

See also
Annie Alexander (disambiguation)